Suresh Kumar and Bihar Laga Ke Rakhna 3 2020 is an Bhojpuri-Language film written and directed by Rajnish Mishra and produced by Nishant Ujjwal under banner of "Renu Vijay Films Entertainment" and present by Abhay Sinha (Yashi Films) and Ease My Trip.com. This film is a remake of the 2014 Tamil film Velaiilla Pattadhari. In this film, Khesari Lal Yadav and Sahar Afsha are in lead roles, while Ritu Singh, Amit Shukla, Shraddha Nawal, Surya Dwivedi, Uday Tiwari, Mahesh Acharya, Neel Kamal Singh, Manoj Tiger, Brijesh Tripathi and others in supporting roles. Amrapali Dubey make special appearance in song "Laga Ke Vaseline".

Mehandi Laga Ke Rakhna 3 which is the third installment to Mehandi Laga Ke Rakhna (2017). Telugu actress Sahar Afsha make her Bhojpuri debut with this film. The film was released on 10 March 2020, coinciding with the Holi festival.

Cast
Khesari Lal Yadav as Raja
Sahar Afsha as Pallavi
Ritu Singh as Sandhya
Amit Shukla as Raja's father
Brijesh Tripathi as Sandhya's father
Mahesh Acharya as Raja's friend
Surya Dwivedi as Villain
Rohit Singh "Matru" as Jha Ji
Shraddha Nawal as Raja's Mother
Uday Tiwari as Vijay, Raja's younger brother
Neel Kamal Singh as Vyas, Raja's friend
Manoj Tiger as Manoj, Raja's Maternal uncle
Amrapali Dubey as Special appearance in "Vaseline" song.

Music
Music of Mehandi Laga Ke Rakhna 3 is composed by Rajnish Mishra with lyrics written by Vinay Bihari, Pyare Lal Yadav, Manoj Bhagat, Ajit Halchal and Yadav Raj. The soundtrack included an unusually large number of songs at 8. It is produced under the "Enter10 Music Bhojpuri" Music company, who also bought his satellite rights. Full album is sung by Khesari Lal Yadav, Priyanka Singh, Khushboo Jain, Rajnish Mishra, Neelkamal Singh and Viniti Singh.

First song of this film "Hothwa Se Madhu Chuye" was released on 20 February 2020 on official YouTube channel.

Track list

References

Bhojpuri remakes of Tamil films
2020 films
2020s Bhojpuri-language films